Joan Vila i Grau (14 August 1932 – 11 November 2022) was a Spanish painter and stained-glass artist.

Biography
Interested in liturgical art, he specialized in stained glass for religious buildings, notably with the Sagrada Família in Barcelona. He created art alongside Joan Miró.

Vila-Grau established himself as a theoretician, founding the magazine Qüestions d'Art. He also wrote works such as Els vitrallers de la Barcelona modernista, Descoberta de la taula de vitraller de Girona, El vitrall renaixentista, Le vitrail dans l'architecture de Gaudí.

In 2010, he received the Creu de Sant Jordi from the Generalitat de Catalunya.

Joan Vila-Grau died in Barcelona on 11 November 2022, at the age of 90.

Stained glass in the Sagrada Família

References

1932 births
2022 deaths
20th-century Spanish painters
21st-century Spanish painters
Painters from Barcelona